Frank Worrall is a British journalist and author. He was born in Radcliffe, Bury, and attended Hulme Grammar School, Oldham. He later studied English literature at Sheffield University, before moving to London to work for The Sun, The Sunday Times and Mail on Sunday. He is also the author of 14 books on sport, including the bestselling Roy Keane: Red Man Walking, Rooney, Celtic United and Lewis Hamilton: The Biography.

In the 1980s he was working in music journalism.

In 2012, Worrall published his first novel, Elvis Has Left The Building, with the backing of the Arts Council of England and Wales.

Bibliography

Roy Keane: Red Man Walking
Rooney: Simply Red
Celtic United
Lewis Hamilton: The Biography
Rooney: Wayne's World
The Magnificent Sevens
Big Phil: The Biography of Luiz Felipe Scolari
Nemanja Vidic: The Biography
Ryan Giggs: Giggsy...The Biography
Walking In A Fergie Wonderland...The Biography of Sir Alex Ferguson
Gareth Bale: The Biography
Rory McIlroy: The Biography
Chicharito: The Biography
Elvis Has Left The Building (Novel)
Mario Balotelli: Why Always Me? The Biography
Luis Suarez...The Biography
Rickie Fowler...The Biography
Jamie Vardy...The Boy from Nowhere
Harry Kane...The Biography

References

External links
 
 1st Interview with Morrissey – 1983 "Frank Worrall wanders into the confident world of The Smiths", Melody Maker, 3 September 1983.
 1st Interview with New Order – 1983 "Out of Order", Melody Maker, 12/2/83
 Tommy Docherty – 2006 

British male journalists
Living people
Year of birth missing (living people)